Hybrid fruits are created through the controlled speciation of fruits that creates new varieties and cross-breeds. Hybrids are grown using plant propagation to create new cultivars. This may introduce an entirely new type of fruit or improve the properties of an existing fruit.

Examples
Nectaplum
Pluot
Tangelo
Orangequat
Garden strawberry
plumcot
rangpur
blood lime
ugli fruit
tay fruit

References